Nosotros los feos ("We the Ugly") is a 1973 Mexican film. It stars Sara García.

Cast
Apart from Garcia and Sergio Ramos, the film is notable for having a cast that included many famous professional boxers, including world champion boxers Rubén Olivares, Rafael Herrera and Raul Macias as well as Octavio "Famoso" Gomez and Manuel Ramos.

References

External links
 

1973 films
Mexican comedy films
1970s Spanish-language films
1970s Mexican films